This is a list of bridges documented by the Historic American Engineering Record in the U.S. state of Rhode Island.

Bridges

See also
List of bridges on the National Register of Historic Places in Rhode Island

References

List
Rhode Island
Bridges
Bridges
List